Çalıköy station is an unused railway station near Karacalar, Savaştepe, Turkey. Located just outside the village, passenger rail service bypassed the station in December 2017. The station was originally built by the Smyrna Cassaba Railway in 1912 and sold to the Turkish State Railways in 1934.

References

External links
Station timetable

Railway stations in Balıkesir Province
Railway stations opened in 1912
1912 establishments in the Ottoman Empire
Savaştepe District
Railway stations closed in 2017